Everard Digby (died 1540), was an English politician.

He was a Member (MP) of the Parliament of England for Rutland in 1529.

References

Year of birth missing
1540 deaths
English MPs 1529–1536